The Obama Story: The Boy with the Biggest Dream! is a manhwa that is a biography of Barack Obama. T. S. Lee wrote and illustrated the book. Janet Jaywan Shin created the English translation from the original Korean. In the U.S., J.E Chae and Brittany Pogue-Mohammed edited that country's version.

Dasan Books, a Korean publisher, published the story under the U.S. imprint Joyful Stories Press, an imprint for younger readers. The Obama Story was scheduled for release in the U.S. in English on April 21, 2009. The book covers Obama from his childhood to the 2008 U.S. Presidential Election. The publication of the book was later delayed.

References

Manhwa titles
Books about Barack Obama